One Week and a Day (or Shavua ve Yom) is a 2016 Israeli drama film directed by Asaph Polonsky. It was screened in the International Critics' Week section at the 2016 Cannes Film Festival where it won the Gan Foundation Support for Distribution Award. It was one of five films nominated for the Best Film Award at the Ophir Awards.

Plot
Eyal Spivak is shown at the end of a weeks mourning for his late son. He shows indifference to his neighbors since they purposefully avoided them when his son was near death. He and his wife Vicky agree to return to their routine, but instead Eyal chooses to go after a blanket they missed at the hospice and finds medical marijuana, prescribed for his late son, there. He smuggles it and decides to get high with the help of a young neighbor and bonds with him. Vicky asks him to book burial plots near their son, but he forgets and loses the plot. Eyal tries to get the plot and even attends the burial process of the person that is getting their plot and finds closure. Vicky who had a tough day gets emotional when she hears from Eyal that they have lost the plot. After the day Eyal sets out to change things in his life and consider living worth by starting to make his wife smile.

Cast
  as Eyal Spivak
 Tomer Kapon as Zohar Zooler
 Sharon Alexander as Shmulik Zooler
 Carmit Mesilati Kaplan as Keren Zooler
 Jenya Dodina as Vicky Spivak
 Uri Gavriel as Refael

References

External links
 

2016 films
2016 drama films
2016 directorial debut films
Israeli drama films
2010s Hebrew-language films